"The Final War of Olly Winter" is the first television play episode of the first season of the American television series CBS Playhouse. Written by Ronald Ribman, it followed the tale of Olly Winter, an African-American Master Sergeant in the Vietnam War who is walking back to allied-controlled land following a battle with the Viet Cong.  Along the way, he meets up with a Vietnamese girl, an orphaned infant, and a dog.  The program is basically a monologue as the character of Winter speaks to the girl about his experiences even though she cannot understand him.

The episode was broadcast on CBS on January 29, 1967. Ivan Dixon, who played the title character, was nominated for an Emmy Award for his performance.

Cast 
 Ivan Dixon as Olly Winter
 Maidie Norman as Mrs. Pierce
 Paulene Myers as Olly's mother
 James Hong as Vietnamese lieutenant
 Tina Chen as Vietnamese girl
 Patrick Adiarte as Viet Cong guerilla
 Kam Tong as Chief elder

References

External links 
 
 The Paley Center for Media

1967 American television episodes
1967 plays
CBS Playhouse episodes
Television episodes about Vietnam War